The São João da Ponta Extractive Reserve is a coastal marine extractive reserve in the state of Pará, Brazil.

Location

The São João da Ponta Extractive Reserve is in the municipality of São João da Ponta, Pará.
It lies along the east shore of the Barreto River and the west shore of the Mocajuba River, upstream from the islands of the delta formed by these two rivers.
The Mocapajuba Marine Extractive Reserve is to the west and the Mãe Grande de Curuçá Extractive Reserve is to the east.

Environment

Average annual rainfall is 

Birds include the small and large great egret (Ardea alba), garça morena; colhereiro; small and large maçarico; marreca; pica pau; saracura; socó boi; taqueré; piaçoca; guará; maguari; gavião; and ariramba. Crustaceans include caranguejo; siri, camarões; and craca. 
Mollusks are caramujo do mangue; mexilhões, sapequara, turú, and ostra. 
Mammals include the boto; guaxinim; quati; tamanduá. 
Fish include the pescada branca; tainha; sardinha; camurim, corvina; acari; bandeirado; caíca; dourada; peixe pedra; amoré; bagre; and tralhoto. 
Reptiles include tartarugas; jíboia; sucuri and surucucu.
The West Indian manatee (Trichechus manatus) is a protected species in the reserve.

History

The São João da Ponta Extractive Reserve was created by federal decree on 13 December 2002.
The reserve is classed as IUCN protected area category VI (protected area with sustainable use of natural resources).
The objectives is to protect the livelihoods and culture of the traditional extractive communities of the region, and ensure sustainable use of the natural resources.
It is administered by the Chico Mendes Institute for Biodiversity Conservation (ICMBio).

On 22 June 2005 INCRA recognised the reserve as supporting 350 families of small rural producers, who would be eligible for PRONAF support. This was revised to 1,250 families on 5 January 2008.
The consultative council was created on 5 February 2007.
On 23 March 2010 ICMBio granted use of the reserve to the Association of Users of the São João da Ponta Extractive Reserve.

Notes

Sources

Marine extractive reserves of Brazil
Protected areas of Pará
Protected areas established in 2002
2002 establishments in Brazil